Batophila rubi  is a species of leaf beetle native to Europe.

References

External links
Images representing Batophila rubi at BOLD

Alticini
Beetles described in 1799
Beetles of Europe
Taxa named by Gustaf von Paykull